Qand-e Nur-e Sepahan (also Romanized as Qand-e Nūr-e Sepāhān) is a village in Borkhar-e Gharbi Rural District, in the Central District of Shahin Shahr and Meymeh County, Isfahan Province, Iran. At the 2006 census, its population was 20, in 6 families.

References 

Populated places in Shahin Shahr and Meymeh County